The Public Sector Pension Investment Board (PSP Investments) is a Canadian Crown corporation established by an act of Parliament in September 1999. PSP Investments is one of Canada's largest pension investment managers, with CAD $204.5 billion of net assets under management as at March 31, 2021. It invests funds for the pension plans of the Public Service, the Canadian Armed Forces, the Royal Canadian Mounted Police and the Reserve Force.

More than 1000 professionals manage a diversified global portfolio composed of investments in public financial markets, private equity, real estate, infrastructure, natural resources and private debt. PSP Investments' head office is located in Ottawa, Ontario, and its chief business office is located in Montreal, Quebec. It also has offices in New York City, London and Hong Kong.

History
PSP Investments was incorporated as a Crown corporation under the Public Sector Pension Investment Board Act in 1999. The investments will fund retirement benefits under the Plans for service after April 1, 2000, for the Public Service, Canadian Armed Forces, Royal Canadian Mounted Police, and after March 1, 2007, for the Reserve Force.

In May 2013, German construction company Hochtief sold its airports division (renamed AviAlliance) to PSP Investments for 1.1 billion euros.  In October 2015, PSP Investments formed a joint venture with ATL Partners, creating SKY Leasing, a service aircraft leasing company.

References

External links
Official website

Federal departments and agencies of Canada
Companies based in Ottawa
1999 establishments in Canada
Organizations established in 1999
Public sector in Canada
Canadian federal Crown corporations
Public pension funds in Canada